Bird's foot may refer to:

 Bird feet and legs, part of the anatomy of birds
 Dactyly in birds, the arrangement of the digits of a bird's foot
 Plaquemines-Balize delta or Bird's Foot Delta, part of the Mississippi River Delta

Plants 
 Ornithopus or bird's-foot, a genus of flowering plants
 Cardamine concatenata, bird's foot toothwort
 Eleusine indica, bird's foot grass
 Viola pedata, bird's foot violet
 Ranunculus pedatifidus, birdfoot buttercup
 Birdsfoot trefoil, Lotus corniculatus
 Birdfoot sagebrush, Artemisia pedatifida
 Bird's foot cranesbill, various species in the genus Geranium
 Various species in the genus Erodium

See also 
 Bird's Fort, Texas
 Chicken claw (disambiguation)
 Chicken foot (disambiguation)
 Crow foot (disambiguation)
 Eagle claw (disambiguation)
 Goose foot (disambiguation)